The 5th Infantry Brigade "István Bocskai", is a brigade-sized formation of the Hungarian Defence Forces.

History 
The predecessor to brigade was formed in 1951 in Mezőtúr. After several restructurings during which the brigade was rebuilt into a mechanized infantry brigade, it was relocated to Debrecen in 1990.

On September 29, 1990, the brigade adopted the name of István Bocskai. In 2004, the sub-units previously located in Nyíregyháza moved to Debrecen and Hajdúhadház. At the same time,  two mixed light battalions belonging to the 62nd Miklós Bercsényi Mechanized Infantry Brigade (located in Hódmezővásárhely), were also restructured in the brigade.

The formation was again reorganized in 2007. On March 1, 2007, the Minister of Defense established the 5th István Bocskai Rifle Brigade of the Hungarian Defense Forces, which is the current name of the brigade. The same year, an independent reconnaissance battalion located in Eger, now known today as the 24th Gergely Bornemissza Reconnaissance Regiment, entered the Debrecen garrison as a subordinate reconnaissance battalion of the brigade, but later it was reformed as a separate regiment.

Structure

Inventory 
 Infantry weapons 
 AK-63
 CZ Bren 2
 PKM
 SVD
 RPG-7
 Vehicles 
 BTR-80 (both BTR-80 and BTR-80A variants)
 Other specialist vehicles such as logistics or signalling support vehicles

Reference section

Military units and formations of Hungary